Fernando Aramburu (San Sebastián, 1959) is a Spanish writer.

Career 
He graduated in Spanish Philology from University of Zaragoza and has been living and working as a lecturer in Spanish language in Germany since 1985. His 2006 novel Fuegos con limón described his youthful experiences in Grupo CLOC de Arte y Desarte, a surrealist group which published a magazine between 1978 and 1981. He won the Premio Tusquets de Novela in 2011 for his novel Años lentos, and the Premio Biblioteca Breve in 2015 for Ávidas pretensiones. He is considered among the most important living Spanish writers, alongside novelists like Arturo Pérez-Reverte, Andrés Pascual and Eduardo Mendoza, all of them included in the so-called Spanish New Narrative.

Works 
 Fuegos con limón (Fires with Lemon) (won the Ramón Gómez de le Serna prize in 1997)
 Los ojos vacíos (Empty Eyes) (Euskadi Prize in 2001)
 El Trompetista del Utopia (The Trompetist of Utopia) (made into a film called Under the Stars)
 Bambi sin sombra (Shadowless Bambi)
 El artista y su cadaver (The Artist and his Corpse) (short prose writings)
 Vida de un piojo llamado Matías (Life of a louse called Matias) (children's book)
 No ser no duele (Not being does not hurt) (short stories)
 Los peces de la amargura (The Fish of Bitterness) (short stories; won the Mario Varga Llosa NH prize in 2006)
 Ávidas pretensiones (Avid Pretensions) (2014)
 Patria (Homeland) (2016)
 Autorretrato sin mí (Self-portrait without me) (2018)
 Los vencejos (The swifts) (2021)

References

Sources 
 (eus) Arinas, Txema (Berria 10/11/2016), 'Eppur si muove' Retrieved 25/08/2018.
 (es) Zaldua, Iban (https://vientosur.info/ 22 march 2017), «La literatura, ¿sirve para algo? Una crítica de Patria, de Fernando Aramburu». Retrieved  25/08/2018.
 Bedside stories No. 8. - NH Hoteles

Spanish male writers
Living people
1959 births
People from San Sebastián